The Glorious Sons are a Canadian rock band from Kingston, Ontario. Formed in 2011, the band signed with Black Box in 2013. Since then, The Glorious Sons have released one EP, Shapeless Art, and three full-length albums; The Union, which was released on September 14, 2014, and their second album Young Beauties and Fools, which was released on October 13, 2017, and finally A War On Everything released September 13, 2019. The band have eight consecutive top-10 rock radio hits in Canada including their first #1 modern rock single "Everything Is Alright".

History

2011–2013: Formation, Shapeless Art 
The Glorious Sons were founded as a five-piece in 2011 and issued their first EP, Shapeless Art independently in 2013 featuring their first radio single, "Mama" which reached #6 on the Canadian rock radio charts. Shapeless Art was produced by John-Angus MacDonald and mixed by Gordie Johnson. The band signed to the eclectic Canadian label Black Box Music later that year, and re-released the EP alongside the single "White Noise" which reached #2 on the Canadian rock radio charts. The band toured nationally to support the EP, including dates with Head of the Herd, The Balconies, Teenage Kicks and more.

2014–2016: The Union and "Sometimes on a Sunday" 
Between tours in March 2014, the group then began recording their debut full-length, The Union at Catherine North Studio in Hamilton, Ontario, with producer John-Angus MacDonald of The Trews. The album was completed in June 2014, including remixed versions of the tracks "Mama" and "White Noise" from the Shapeless Art EP,  and two tracks added later that summer; the singles "Heavy" and "Lightning" produced by Gavin Brown. The album was released on September 14, 2014 with "Heavy" as the lead single, which reached #3 on the Canadian rock radio charts. The album produced the subsequent singles "Lightning" and "The Contender" which reached #2 and #1 respectively on the Canadian rock radio charts.

To support the release of The Union, the group toured Canada supporting Airbourne and The Trews. They also toured the United States with 10 Years and performed at festivals such as Rock on the Range, Rocklahoma, Northern Invasion, Carolina Rebellion and more in 2016.

The Union was nominated for a Juno Award for Best Rock Album, and The Glorious Sons were nominated and won "Group of the Year" and "Rock Group of the Year" at the SiriusXM Indie Awards at Canadian Music Week in 2015.

In October 2015, the band released the self-produced stand-alone single, "Sometimes on a Sunday". The song was produced at North of Princess Studio in Kingston, Ontario. It was released digitally on October 30, 2015, and saw a physical release as the B-side of the "Kill the Lights/Sometimes on a Sunday" limited-edition 7" released in November 2017.

2017–2018: "Kill the Lights" and Young Beauties and Fools 
On January 27, 2017, they released their stand-alone single, "Kill the Lights". The track was produced by Jason Murray and the band at Metalworks Studios in Mississauga, Ontario in August 2016. The music video for the song was shot in Toronto, Ontario in December 2016, with the live performance scenes shot at Sneaky Dee's. The song peaked at #2 on the Canadian rock radio charts following its release. Though initially only released digitally, the track was included as the a-side of the Kill The Lights/Sometimes on a Sunday limited-edition 7" released in November 2017.

The band began recording their second full-length album, Young Beauties and Fools in Los Angeles in February and March 2017 with producer group Fast Friends. The album was mixed in July 2017 by Matty Green, and the lead single "Everything Is Alright" was released on July 21, 2017. Following the release of the single, the band signed international label deals with Earache Records in the UK, Europe and Japan, and with BMG Rights Management in the United States and Australia to release the new album.

Young Beauties and Fools was released on October 13, 2017. The band supported the album release by joining rock group, Greta Van Fleet, as support on select dates of their American Tour (between August and November 2017). "Everything Is Alright" peaked at #1 on the Canadian Alternative rock radio charts, and see airplay internationally including BBC Radio 1 championed by Daniel P. Carter. "Everything Is Alright" was named as Edge 102.1's #3 song of 2017, and Indie 88's #28 song of 2017.

At the Juno Awards of 2018, Young Beauties and Fools won the Juno Award for Rock Album of the Year.

2019–present: A War on Everything 
On June 5, 2019, they released the first single from their third album A War on Everything, entitled "Panic Attack". To promote the album, the band announced a US tour with British rock band The Struts that took place over the summer of 2019. On July 17, 2019, the title, cover, and tracklist of A War on Everything was unveiled, alongside a release date of September 13, 2019. On this date, the band also released the song "Pink Motel" from the album. On August 16, 2019, the band released a third song from the album in anticipation of its release, "The Ongoing Speculation Into The Death of Rock and Roll".

Following the release of A War on Everything, the band announced a headlining North American tour on September 23, 2019. The tour would feature guests Des Rocs on American dates and Black Pistol Fire on Canadian dates.

On May 18, 2021, the band released a new single called "Daylight".

Personnel

Current members
Brett Emmons – vocals, guitar, harmonica, keys
Jay Emmons – guitar, vocals
Chris Koster – guitar, vocals
Adam Paquette – drums, vocals
Josh Hewson – piano, guitar
Peter Van Helvoort - Bass Guitar, vocals

Past members
Andrew Young – guitar, vocals
Chris Huot - Bass - Sadly, he has left the band on his own accord after the passing of his brother, and doubtful to return

Touring musicians
 Tony Silvestri – piano, acoustic guitar (2015–2016)
 Peter Van Helvoort - Bass (2021 - present) - Currently a member of The Glorious Sons as well as the lead singer in Darling Congress. Peter, is currently an active member of both bands

Discography

Studio albums

Live albums

EPs

Singles

Music videos

Awards and nominations
 2015 Juno Awards - Rock Album of the Year (Nominee) 
 2015 SiriusXM Indie Awards - Group of the Year (Winner) 
 2015 SiriusXM Indie Awards - Artist of the Year (Winner) 
 2018 Juno Awards - Rock Album of the Year (Winner)
 2020 Juno Awards - Rock Album of the Year (Winner)

References

Canadian hard rock musical groups
Musical groups from Kingston, Ontario
Musical groups established in 2011
Juno Award for Rock Album of the Year winners
2011 establishments in Ontario